The boys' 62 kg weightlifting event was the second men's event at the weightlifting competition at the 2010 Summer Youth Olympics, with competitors limited to a maximum of 62 kilograms of body mass. The whole competition took place on August 15 at 14:30.

Each lifter performed in both the snatch and clean and jerk lifts, with the final score being the sum of the lifter's best result in each. The athlete received three attempts in each of the two lifts; the score for the lift was the heaviest weight successfully lifted.

Medalists

Results

References
 Results

Weightlifting at the 2010 Summer Youth Olympics